Washington's 11th legislative district is one of forty-nine districts in Washington state for representation in the state legislature.

The district includes southern Seattle, Renton, Tukwila, and a portion of Kent.

The district's legislators are state senator Bob Hasegawa and state representatives David Hackney (position 1) and Steve Bergquist (position 2), all Democrats.

See also
Washington Redistricting Commission
Washington State Legislature
Washington State Senate
Washington House of Representatives
Washington (state) legislative districts

References

External links
Washington State Redistricting Commission
Washington House of Representatives
Map of Legislative Districts

11